Stanley "Stan" Smrke (September 2, 1928 — April 14, 1977) was a Yugoslavian-born Canadian ice hockey forward. He played 9 games in the National Hockey League with the Montreal Canadiens during the 1956–57 and 1957–58 seasons. The rest of his career, which lasted from 1947 to 1967, was spent in the minor leagues.

Career
Smrke started his National Hockey League career with the Montreal Canadiens in 1956. He was the first Yugoslavian-born player ever to play in the NHL. Smrke played his entire NHL career (9 games) with the Habs. Over his career, he scored a total of three assists before being dropped by the team.  His final season in the NHL was the 1957–58 season.

After leaving the NHL, he was sent to the minor leagues and became a member of the Rochester Americans. He is currently ranked fifth all-time in the Rochester Americans Hall of Fame.

Personal life
He was born as Stanko Smrke in Belgrade, in what was then the Kingdom of Serbs, Croats and Slovenes to a Slovene father and a Serb mother. His son, John Smrke, was also a hockey player and played 103 games in the NHL with the St. Louis Blues and Quebec Nordiques.

Career statistics

Regular season and playoffs

External links
 
 

1928 births
1977 deaths
Baltimore Clippers (1945–49) players
Canadian ice hockey forwards
Canadian people of Serbian descent
Canadian people of Slovenian descent
Chicoutimi Saguenéens (QSHL) players
Montreal Canadiens players
Rochester Americans players
Sportspeople from Belgrade
Toronto Young Rangers players
Yugoslav emigrants to Canada
Canadian expatriate ice hockey players in the United States